Oss is a surname. Notable people with the surname include:

Albert Oss (1818–1898), Union Army soldier
Daniel Oss (born 1987), Italian cyclist

See also
Ost (surname)